The Alba Regia was a Hungarian microcar project produced in Székesfehérvár by both the Ministry of Metallurgy and Machine Industry in conjunction with the Vehicle Developing Institute in 1952/1953. In 1955 three engineers were commissioned to work on the car; Ernő Rubik, Pal Kerekes, and Geza Bengyel. Along with two employees, József Zappel and József Horváth, the group conceived of the Alba Regia, named for the Latin name of the city, where it was made, and the Balaton, named for Hungary's Lake Balaton.

External links
Hungarian MircoCars of the 50s by Paul Negyesi

Cars of Hungary
Microcars
Cars introduced in 1955
Defunct motor vehicle manufacturers of Hungary
1955 establishments in Hungary
Manufacturing companies established in 1955